SM UB-87 was a German Type UB III submarine or U-boat in the German Imperial Navy during World War I. She was commissioned into the German Imperial Navy on 27 December 1917 as SM UB-87.

 
UB-87 was surrendered to France on 20 November 1918 in accordance with the requirements of the Armistice with Germany. She was broken up in Brest in 1921.

Construction

She was built by AG Weser of Bremen and following just under a year of construction, launched at Bremen on 10 November 1917. UB-87 was commissioned later that same year . Like all Type UB III submarines, UB-87 carried 10 torpedoes and was armed with a  deck gun. UB-87 had a displacement of  while surfaced and  when submerged. Her engines enabled her to travel at  when surfaced and  when submerged.

Summary of raiding history

References

Notes

Citations

Bibliography 

 

German Type UB III submarines
World War I submarines of Germany
U-boats commissioned in 1917
1917 ships
Ships built in Bremen (state)